Kurt Vilhelm Jørgensen (May 27, 1897 in Varpelev – October 3, 1967 in Kregme) was a Danish football (soccer) player, who played 15 games for the Denmark national football team from 1917 to 1923. He was a part of the Danish squad at the 1920 Summer Olympics, but spent the tournament as an unused reserve. Born in Varpelev. Jørgensen played as a defender for Copenhagen team B 1903.

References

External links
Danish national team profile
 Haslund profile

1897 births
1967 deaths
Danish men's footballers
Denmark international footballers
Olympic footballers of Denmark
Footballers at the 1920 Summer Olympics
Association football defenders